The 1926 Daniel Baker Hillbillies football team represented Daniel Baker College as a member of the Texas Intercollegiate Athletic Association (TIAA) during the 1926 college football season. Led by Shorty Ransom in his second season as head coach, the team went 7–2–1.  Daniel Baker won the TIAA title with a 4–0 mark in conference play.

Schedule

References

Daniel Baker
Daniel Baker Hillbillies football seasons
Daniel Baker Hillbillies football